Philip Stuart (1760 – August 14, 1830) was an American politician and soldier who represented the state of Maryland in the House of Representatives.

Early life
Philip Stuart was born near Fredericksburg in the Virginia Colony, and completed his preparatory education before moving to Maryland.

Career
Stuart served during the American Revolutionary War as a lieutenant in the 3rd Continental Light Dragoons, and was wounded at Eutaw Springs on September 8, 1781.  He transferred to Baylor's dragoons on November 9, 1782, and later served as a lieutenant in the Second Artillerists and Engineers, beginning on June 5, 1798, and ending with his resignation on November 15, 1800.  He also served in the War of 1812.

Stuart was elected as a Federalist to the 12th U.S. Congress and to the three succeeding Congresses, serving from March 4, 1811, to March 3, 1819.

Death
Stuart died in Washington, D.C., and is interred in the Congressional Cemetery.

References

External links 
 

1760 births
1830 deaths
Politicians from Fredericksburg, Virginia
Burials at the Congressional Cemetery
Continental Army officers from Maryland
People from Maryland in the War of 1812
Federalist Party members of the United States House of Representatives from Maryland